Brighton School (fr.: L'école de Brighton) was a loosely associated group of pioneering filmmakers active in the Brighton and Hove area of England from 1896 to 1910. It was mostly a series of shorts and early projects in films from the school of the Brighton area.

History
The core membership of the group consists of filmmakers George Albert Smith, James Williamson and Esmé Collings as well as engineer Alfred Darling; other names associated with the group include Collings' former business partner William Friese-Greene and the group's London-based distributor Charles Urban.

Term origins
The term was coined by French film historian Georges Sadoul in an article that was translated and re-published in pamphlet form as British Creators of Film Technique by the British Film Institute in 1948.

See also
Magic lantern
Home movie

References

External links
1960s film about Brighton pioneers on Huntley Film Archives' official YouTube channel

Cinema of England
British cinema pioneers
Movements in cinema
1890s in film
1900s in film
1910s in film
1890s in British cinema
1900s in British cinema
1910s in British cinema